Leslie Allen (born 13 September 1954) is an Australian former cricketer. He played seven first-class matches for Tasmania between 1980 and 1984.

See also
 List of Tasmanian representative cricketers

References

External links
 

1954 births
Living people
Australian cricketers
Tasmania cricketers
Cricketers from Tasmania